"Stay with You" is a song recorded by the Goo Goo Dolls. It was released in April 2006 as the second single from their eighth studio album, Let Love In.  The song is the second single released from the album, following "Better Days". It was released as a double A-side with a re-release of the band's signature song "Iris", originally from Dizzy Up the Girl. The single was certified Gold by the RIAA in October 2009.

Track listing 
Initial pressing
"Stay with You" - 3:56
"Iris" - 4:51

Alternate pressing
"Stay with You" - 3:56
"Iris" - 4:51
"Let Love In" (Live)

Vinyl pressing
"Stay with You" - 3:56
"Iris" - 4:51

Charts

Weekly charts

Year-end charts

Certifications

References 

Goo Goo Dolls songs
2006 singles
Song recordings produced by Glen Ballard
Songs written by Glen Ballard
Songs written by John Rzeznik
2006 songs
Warner Records singles